Hem is a commune in the Nord department in northern France.

It is located near the city of Roubaix.

History 
Hem is one of the oldest communes in the North of France. Originally known as ‘Ham’, it became ‘Hem’ during the 14th century. The name means ‘the dwelling-place’ and suggests a large number of households of the size of a hamlet.

It was at first essentially an agricultural centre with the fine plains of Hauts-Champs, Longchamp, Beaumont and Le Civron, but would reach the height of its industrial prosperity in 1900 although there would still be 41 farmers.

It was after the Second World War that the population of Hem began to grow rapidly. In the space of twenty years, Hem's population quadrupled. The town's former centre found itself increasingly pushed towards the town limits; the new housing was largely concentrated around the north of the town and would accommodate almost 50 per cent of the population. This housing would count for 72 per cent of the total housing of Hem but only 15 per cent of the total area of the town.

Unfortunately, the employment offered by the various firms and retail outlets of the town would not keep pace with the town's growth. In 1975, only 2 200 jobs were on offer to a potential workforce of 7 890 people (almost half of whom were manual workers). From the mid-1970s, with deindustrialisation, the town's population began experiencing slow but regular decline.

Since the 1990s, the municipal authority of Hem has prioritized the town's economic prosperity; as a result, around 15 new firms have set up in the town.

Population

Heraldry

Monuments
The Chapelle Sainte Thérèse (Saint Theresa's Chapel) was consecrated in 1958 by Cardinal Achille Liénart, Bishop of Lille. It was designed by the Swiss architect Hermann Baur. Its shape is reminiscent of a barn. It contains numerous works of modern art, including two walls of stained glass produced by Alfred Manessier. A scene from the French film The Dreamlife of Angels was shot within the Chapel.

People
Daouda Sow (silver medallist in lightweight boxing at the 2008 Olympics).
 Alain Bondue (French Olympic racing cyclist).
Michael Fortunati, pop singer, born in Italy but raised in Hem.
Saida Jawad, French actress.

Twin towns
Hem is twinned with the following towns:
  Mossley, Greater Manchester, United Kingdom
  Aljustrel, Alentejo Portugal
  Wiehl, North Rhine-Westphalia, Germany

See also
Communes of the Nord department

References

External links

Official website 

Communes of Nord (French department)
French Flanders